Harvey Edson Orwick (April 27, 1890 – June 5, 1949) was an American football and basketball coach.  He was the head football coach at Adrian College in Adrian, Michigan for one seasons, in 1919, compiling a record of 4–2.  Leith was also the head basketball coach at Adrian from 1919 to 1921, tallying a mark of 10–21.  He was born on a farm near Arlington, Ohio.

Head coaching record

Football

References

External links
 

1890 births
1949 deaths
Adrian Bulldogs football coaches
Adrian Bulldogs men's basketball coaches
People from Hancock County, Ohio